The men's 200 metre butterfly competition of the swimming events at the 1959 Pan American Games took place on 3 September (preliminaries) and 4 September (finals). The last Pan American Games champion was Eulalio Ríos of Mexico.

This race consisted of four lengths of the pool, all lengths being in butterfly stroke.

Results
All times are in minutes and seconds.

Heats
The first round was held on September 3.

Final 
The final was held on September 4.

References

Swimming at the 1959 Pan American Games